International Consumer Research & Testing (ICRT) is a global consortium of more than 40 consumer organisations dedicated to carrying out joint research and testing in the consumer interest.

ICRT's principal objectives are to facilitate co-operation between its members and to promote research and testing in the field of consumer goods and services.

ICRT Tests
ICRT members co-operate in a programme of continuous testing on a wide range of popular consumer products such as digital cameras, mobile phones, television sets, cars, washing machines, dishwashers, vacuum cleaners and light bulbs.

In addition, there are numerous other smaller collaborative tests, on a whole range of consumer products from anti-wrinkle creams to athletic shoes.

Safety has always been a topic of concern to consumer organisations. ICRT members have played a key role in promoting higher safety standards for consumer goods.

ICRT also facilitates information exchange and testing between members in areas such as food, health, the environment and financial services.

ICRT members join forces with motor clubs with the aim of testing cars, tyres and infant car seats. ICRT is a key player in European New Car Assessment Programme (Euro NCAP) and a similar programme in Latin America.

ICRT Members

All ICRT member organisations act exclusively in the consumer interest. They do not accept advertising and are independent of commerce, industry and political parties. Werner Brinkmann is the German member of the board of ICRT. ICRT works closely with the two other international campaigning consumer organisations, to which many ICRT members also belong: 
 BEUC - The European Consumer Organisation
 CI - Consumers International

Member organisations range in size from the largest consumer organisations worldwide with memberships between 200,000 and 7 million to smaller organisations with less than 10,000 members.

ICRT's major members are: Which? (United Kingdom), Consumer Reports (United States of America), Stiftung Warentest (Germany), Association des Consommateurs Test Achats (Belgium), Union Fédérale des Consommateurs Que Choisir (France), Consumentenbond (Netherlands). ICRT has member organisations in Europe, Asia Pacific, Latin America and Africa.
 Argentina - Consumidores Argentinos
 Australia - Choice
 Austria - Verein Fur Konsumenteninformation
 Belgium - Association des Consommateurs Test-Achats SC
 Brazil - Pro Teste - Associacao Brasiliera de Defesa do Consumidor
 Bulgaria - Bulgarian National Consumers Association
 Canada - Protegez-Vous
 Chile - The Organisation for the Defence of Consumers and Users in Chile
 China - Association for Comparative & Objective Testing in Europe for Safety & Trust e.V.
 China - Okoer (no site)
 China - Mingjian (License) 
 China - ShenZhen Consumer Council (no site)
 Cyprus - Cyprus Consumers' Association
 Czech Republic - Consumer Organisation dTest
 Denmark - Taenk/Forbrugerraadet (Danish Consumer Council)
 Finland - Kuluttajatietoisuuden edistamisyhdistys ry. (Association for advancing consumer awareness)
 France - Que Choisir (UFC)
 Germany - Stiftung Warentest
 Hungary - Teszt es Piac Fogyasztovedelmi Egyesulet
 Hungary -Association of Conscious Consumers
 Greenland - Greenlands Forbrugerrad 
 China - Hong Kong Consumer Council
 Iceland - Neytendasamtokin
 Ireland - Consumer's Association of Ireland
 Italy - Altroconsumo Edizioni SRL
 Japan - National Consumer Affairs Center of Japan (Affiliate)
 Korea - Citizens' Alliance for Consumer Protection of Korea
 Netherlands - Consumentenbond
 New Zealand - Consumer New Zealand
 Norway - Forbrukerradet
 Peru - Peruvian Association of Consumers and Users
 Poland - Pro-Test Foundation
 Portugal - DECO-Proteste Editores LDA
 National Association for Consumer Protection and Promotion of Programs and Strategies Romania
 Romania - Romania Association for Consumer Protection
 Russia - Konfop
 Russia - RusQuality
 Singapore - Consumers Association of Singapore
 Slovenia - Zveza Potrosnikov Slovenije
 South Africa - National Consumer Forum of South Africa
 Spain - Ediciones SA (OCU)
 Sweden - Rad & Ron
 Switzerland - Federation Romande des Consommateurs
 Switzerland - Konsumenteninfo AG
 Switzerland - Stiftung fur Konsumentenschutz
 Taiwan - Consumer Foundation of Chinese Taipei
 Thailand - Foundation for Consumers
 Ukraine - Test
 UK - Which?
 USA - Consumer Reports

History
ICRT was formally set up as a not for profit association under United Kingdom law in 1990 but it is based on a long tradition of co-operation between independent consumer organisations since the 1960s:

 1968 – The first joint tests between the Dutch and Belgian organisations included hairdryers, dishwashers, stereo receivers and model trains. A test of hotels in Majorca was also joined by Germany.
 1972 – The name European Testing Group (ETG) was adopted. 
 1974 – By now twelve organisations were attending ETG meetings including those from The Netherlands, Belgium, Germany, UK, France, Denmark, Norway, Switzerland and Austria.
 1982 – ETG Secretariat moved to London and an increasing number of collaborative tests were carried out each year
 1990 – A new organisation – International Consumer Research & Testing was created to formalise the arrangements of the ETG. 
 1991 – First European Commission (EC)-funded project “Comparative Testing in Europe” completed. This laid the basis for discussion about future ICRT EC-funded comparative testing projects.
 1992 – First ICRT Guidelines issued
 1996 – ICRT became a founder member of the Euro NCAP crash test programme
 1999 – Guido Adriaenssens appointed CEO. ICRT now has 26 members
 2002 – Nordic Testing Group formed.
 2004 – Consumers Union (USA) joins ICRT, Asia-Pacific Regional Group met for the first time
 2007–2010 Capacity building in new EU Member States lead to formation of Central & Eastern Europe Regional Group in 2010
 2008 – Worldwide test on breakfast cereals published – joined by 30 partners
 2010 – Latin NCAP launched
 2011 – launch of Global NCAP
 2017 – ICRT has more than 35 member organisations

References

External links
 International Consumer Research and Testing Ltd

Consumer organisations in the United Kingdom
International organisations based in London
Organisations based in the London Borough of Islington
Product-testing organizations